Presidente Castelo Branco can refer to:

Presidente Castelo Branco, Paraná, municipality in the state of Paraná of Brazil
Presidente Castelo Branco, Santa Catarina, municipality in the state of Santa Catarina in the South region of Brazil

See also
Humberto de Alencar Castelo Branco, president of Brasil in 1964—1967